Maria Botalova (born 8 October 1990) is a Russian rower. She competed in the women's lightweight double sculls event at the 2020 Summer Olympics.

References

External links
 

1990 births
Living people
Russian female rowers
Olympic rowers of Russia
Rowers at the 2020 Summer Olympics
Place of birth missing (living people)